Zinc transporter ZIP10, also known as solute carrier family 39 member 10, is a protein that in humans is encoded by the SLC39A10 gene. ZIP10 belongs to a subfamily of proteins that show structural characteristics of zinc transporters, and have 14 members in the human genome: ZIP1, ZIP2, ZIP3, ZIP4, ZIP5, ZIP6, ZIP7, ZIP8, ZIP9, ZIP10, ZIP11, ZIP12, ZIP13 and ZIP14.

References

Further reading

Solute carrier family